Etheridge may refer to:

People

 Bill Etheridge, a British politician, Member of the European Parliament for UKIP  
 Bob Etheridge (born 1941), US Representative
 Chris Etheridge, British sidecarcross rider
 Emerson Etheridge, late US Representative
 George Etherege, English dramatist
 Joanne Etheridge, Australian physicist
 John Etheridge, English Jazz guitarist
 John Wesley Etheridge (1804–1866), English nonconformist minister and scholar
 Melissa Etheridge, a singer-songwriter
 Neil Etheridge, English-Filipino footballer
 Robert Etheridge (1819–1903), English geologist and palaeontologist.
Robert Etheridge, Junior (1847–1920), English palaeontologist who worked extensively in Australia
Zac Etheridge: American football coach and player.

Places

 Shire of Etheridge, a local government area in north Queensland, Australia

See also
Ethridge (disambiguation)
Ettridge (disambiguation)